Nicolás Flores is a town and one of the 84 municipalities of Hidalgo, in central-eastern Mexico. The municipality covers an area of 393.2 km².

As of 2005, the municipality had a total population of 6,202. In 2017 there were 3,346 inhabitants who spoke an indigenous language, primarily Mezquital Otomi.

References

Municipalities of Hidalgo (state)
Populated places in Hidalgo (state)